The Testament of Cresseid is a narrative poem of 616 lines in Middle Scots, written by the 15th-century Scottish makar Robert Henryson. It is his best known poem.  It imagines a tragic fate for Cressida in the medieval story of Troilus and Criseyde which was left untold in Geoffrey Chaucer's version. Henryson's cogent psychological drama, in which he consciously resists and confronts the routine depiction of Cressida (Cresseid) as simply 'false', is one of the features that has given the poem enduring interest for modern readers and it is one of the most admired works of northern renaissance literature. A modern English translation by Seamus Heaney, which also included seven of Henryson's fables from The Morall Fabillis, was published in 2009.

Narrative outline

Diomedes, an Achaean hero with whom Cresseid begins a romantic relationship after being separated from and subsequently losing romantic interest in Troilus, banishes Cresseid from his company thereby leaving her destitute. After wandering for a while amongst the Greek soldiers, seeking their company, she returns to the home of her father Calchas, a keeper of the temple of Venus. Though Calchas welcomes her heartily, Cresseid desires to hide away from a disapproving world and encloses herself in a private oratory, where she weeps and rages against the cruelty of Venus and Cupid in, as she sees it, leading her on. The gods take offence at this blasphemy, and assemble to pass judgement on her, and the poem features graphically-realised portraits of the planetary pantheon of gods in the dream vision at its heart. They strike her with the symptoms of leprosy which remove her youth and good looks, leaving her disfigured and blind. She is thus considered a social outcast and decides she must join a leper colony. There she laments her fate until a fellow leper woman encourages her not to sigh over things which cannot be changed, but instead to take her cup and clapper and join the other lepers to beg for daily alms.

As Cresseid joins the lepers to go out begging, Troilus and the garrison of Troy happen to pass by. She lifts her eyes to his, but since she is blind she cannot recognise him. Troilus, similarly unable to recognise the disfigured Cresseid, yet being reminded of her, without quite knowing why, is spontaneously moved to give up to her all the wealth he has about him at that moment (his belt, a full purse of gold, and jewels) before riding off, almost fainting for grief when he reaches Troy. The lepers are astounded at the unexpected show of beneficence and when Cresseid asks of her benefactor's identity and is told, she, like Troilus, too is overcome with emotion. She berates herself for her treatment of him and renounces her previously 'selfish' complaints, before sitting down to write her testament, or will, dying soon after.

Henryson's portrayal of Cresseid's 'disgrace' and ultimately tragic end, through the narrator of the poem, is observed with a largely rigorous objectivity. Where the narrator comes to judge, rather than reinforcing the institutional admonishment of a 'shocked' or disapproving society, he 'confesses' to his natural pity for Cresseid's misfortune, against the standard view of 'false womanhood' which she was taken in his day to represent. This is perhaps all the more expressive for having been apparently withheld or 'repressed' within the conceit of the poem. The most explicit statement of this breaks through in the passage:

            Yit nevertheless, quhat ever men deme or say
            In scornefull langage of thy brukkilnes,
            I sall excuse als far furth as I may
            Thy womanheid, thy wisdome and fairnes,
            The quhilk fortoun hes put to sic distres
            As hir pleisit, and nathing throw the gilt
            Of the, throw wickit langage to be spilt!

Characters
Cresseid, daughter of Calchas, who is punished for breaking her vow of love to Troilus
Troilus, one of the sons of Trojan king Priam, and former lover of Cresseid
Calchas, Cresseid's loving father. In the Testament, he is a priest of Venus and Cupid.
The gods Cupid, Saturn, Jupiter, Mars, Phoebus, Venus, Mercury, and Cynthia.

Structure
Throughout the poem, Henryson makes use of the rhyme royal, a rhyme scheme introduced and popularised by Geoffrey Chaucer, and set out as follows- ABABBCC. The stanzas are generally seven lines each in length, and in iambic pentameter. However, in the section in which Cresseid laments her fate from the leper colony (a Complaint), the stanzas are nine lines in length, and with the rhyme scheme AABAABBAB

Notes

References

Modern edition
The Poems of Robert Henryson. Ed. Robert L. Kindrick. Kalamazoo, Michigan: Medieval Institute Publications, 1997. Electronic Access.
The Testament of Cresseid and Seven Fables. Robert Henryson. Translated by Seamus Heaney. Bloomsbury House, London: Faber and Faber Ltd, 2009

Further reading
Gray, Douglas. Robert Henryson. English Writers of the Late Middle Ages, no. 9. Brookfield, Vermont: Variorum, 1996.
Kindrick, Robert L. "Monarchs and Monarchy in the Poetry of Henryson and Dunbar." In Actes du 2e Colloque de Langue et de Littérature Ecossaisses. Eds. Jean-Jacques Blanchot and Claude Graf. Strasbourg: Université de Strasbourg, 1979. pp. 307–25.
McDiarmid, Matthew P. "Robert Henryson in his Poems." In Bards and Makars. Eds. Adam J. Aitken, Matthew P. McDiarmid, and Derick S. Thompson. Glasgow: University of Glasgow, 1977. pp. 27–40.
Patterson, Lee W. "Christian and Pagan in The Testament of Cresseid." Philological Quarterly 52 (1973), 696–714.
Ridley, Florence. "A Plea for Middle Scots." In The Learned and the Lewed. Ed. Larry D. Benson. Cambridge: Harvard University Press, 1974. pp. 175–96.
Rowland, Beryl. "The 'seiknes incurabill' in Henryson's Testament of Cresseid." English Language Notes 1 (1964), 175–77.
Spearing, A. C. "The Testament of Cresseid and the High Concise Style." In Criticism and Medieval Poetry. London: E. Arnold, 1964. pp. 118–44.
Stephenson, William. "The Acrostic “Fictio” in Robert Henryson's The Testament of Cresseid (Lines 58–63)," Chaucer Review, 92.2 (1994), 163–75.
Utz, Richard. "Writing Alternative Worlds: Rituals of Authorship and Authority in Late Medieval Theological and Literary Discourse." In Creations: Medieval Rituals, the Arts, and the Concept of Creation. Eds. Nils Holger Petersen, et al. Turnhout: Brepols, 2007. pp. 121–38.
Whiting, B. J. "A Probable Allusion to Henryson's 'Testament of Cresseid.' " Modern Language Review 40 (1945), 46–47.

External links 
Online Text via The Medieval and Classical Literature Library

Works by Robert Henryson
Scottish poems
15th-century poems
Narrative poems
Works based on classical literature
15th century in Scotland
Scots language